El Kef, also known as Le Kef, is a city in northwestern Tunisia. It serves as the capital of the Kef Governorate.

The old town is built on the cliff face of the table-top Jebel Dyr mountain. El Kef was the provisional capital of Tunisia during World War II. It was the command centre of the Front de Libération Nationale during the Algerian War of Independence against the French in the 1950s.

The Sidi Bou Makhlouf Mausoleum entombs the patron saint of the city.

Geography 

The municipality of El Kef is shared between two national delegates, East Kef and West Kef, which correspond to the two municipal boroughs.

History

Etymology 
First known by the name of Sicca during the Carthaginian era, then later Sicca Veneria during the rise of Roman domination, the city has carried numerous names throughout its history: Colonia Julia Cirta, Cirta Nova, Sikka Beneria, Shaqbanariya and finally El Kef since the 16th century.

Ancient times

El Kef has since ancient times been the principal city of the High-Tell Mountains and of the Tunisian northwest of which it constituted, until recently, the political center, the most important religious center, and the dominant stronghold.

In the early 5th century Apiarius of Sicca was a priest here, and instigated a dispute between the churches of Carthage and Rome concerning the jurisdiction of the Bishops of Africa when he appealed to the church of Rome against his excommunication by the church of Carthage.

Around 439, invading Vandals conquered the African Romans near the coast. Eventually, El Kef became part of a Berber Kingdom.

Umayyad conquest
In 688 AD, the city was raided during the Umayyad conquest of North Africa.

In the 17th century, a Kasbah of Le Kef was built to house a permanent garrison (ujaq); the construction was completed by the addition of fortified ramparts in 1740.  This did not however prevent the taking and pillaging of the city by the Algerians in 1756, nor the occupation by the French military from 1881, following the partial collapse of the Ottoman Empire.

On July 8, 1884, the authorities of the new French Protectorate declared El Kef a municipality, one of the first in the country.

Contemporary
In 1973, there was a summit meeting here between the Tunisian president Habib Bourguiba and the Algerian president Houari Boumédiène. The latter proposed a constitution for a Tunisian-Algerian union which Bourguiba declined in favor of the development of economic cooperation between the two countries.<ref name=":2">{{cite book|url=https://books.google.com/books?id=Twz0kOnCxXYC&q=kef+1973+boumediene&pg=PA218 |author=Nicole Grimaud|title=La politique extérieure de l'Algérie (1962-1978)|edition=Karthala|location=Paris|year=1984|pages=218–219|isbn=9782865371112}}</ref>

 Climate
The climate is usually unstable, ranging from summer heat waves to winter snow blizzards.

 Main sights 

El Kef contains a certain number of Islamic religious edifices, in its role as the center of a Sufic movement.  The Sidi Bou Makhlouf Mausoleum holds the tomb of the founder of the Aissawa brotherhood in Tunisia, Sidi Bou Makhlouf. The El Qadriya mosque is also important to Sufism.

A legacy of the old local Jewish community, the synagogue of the Ghriba is the object of veneration by Jews of the region, who come in pilgrimage each year during the week marked by the festival of Sukkot.

In the city is the mausoleum of Ali Tukie, the father of Al-Husayn I ibn Ali at-Turki, founder of the Husainid dynasty which ruled Tunisia from 1705 to 1957.

The vestiges, well preserved, of a three-naved Roman basilica dating from the beginning of the 5th century named Dar El Kous, dedicated to Saint Peter, have been discovered.Charles Diehl, L'Afrique byzantine : histoire de la domination byzantine en Afrique. 533-709, éd. Franklin, New York, 1959, p. 422

The enormous Jugurtha Tableland mesa is visible from El Kef.

Culture
 Museums 
The Museum of the Popular Arts and Traditions of El Kef, housed within a museum built in the 18th century, presents collections which retrace the social habits and customs which prevailed before the independence of the country.

 Music 
The Bou Makhlouf festival is held in July each year. The Saliha Festival is held once every other year.  The latter takes its name from the singer Saliha who hails from the region.

 Performing arts 
It is the seat of the National Center for the Dramatic and Scenic Arts of El Kef. The city also organizes the festival of "24 hours of non-stop theatre".

 Cuisine 
The cuisine of El Kef has two recipes specific to the region.  First, a typical regional bread, mjamaa or khobz el aid, is prepared at festival times, covered with an egg and decorated with pastry.  Second, borzgane is a type of couscous lightly sweetened by alternating layers of dry fruits, dates, and lamb meat.

The Festival of Mayou, also known as the Festival of Borzgane, brings the traditional Keffish couscous up to contemporary taste.

 Government 
The city council is composed of 22 members, including a president, vice president, borough chief, six assistants and thirteen counselors.

 Education 
Schools, institutes, and faculties include the El Kef Higher Institute of Applied Studies in the Humanities, El Kef Higher Institute of Music and Theatre, El Kef Higher Institute of Information Technology, El Kef Higher Institute of Physical Education, El Kef Graduate School of Agriculture, and El Kef Higher Institute of Nursing Science.

 Media 
Radio Le Kef, the regional radio service founded November 7, 1991, covers the northwest of the country.

 Transportation 

The transportation company of El Kef is the only company offering a public transit service by bus.   The city is linked with surrounding cities by a network of taxis called louage, and with the capital, Tunis, by a regional railway line passing through Dahmani.

 Sports 
In sports, the Olympique du Kef, city soccer club founded in 1922 won the 2009-2010 League II Championship.

The El Kef Higher Institute of Sport and Physical Education runs the annual Tunisian Women's Soccer Championship.

 Sister-city 
El Kef has had a sister-city relationship since 1993 with Bourg-en-Bresse, France, officially sealed in 1999 and 2000 with the signing of an agreement of exchange and friendship.

Media references
In 1855, John Henry Newman published a novel, Callista, which was set in Sicca Veneria in the 3rd century AD (Roman era).

People

Caelius Aurelianus, c. 5th century physician and medical writer, he translated works by Soranus from Greek into Latin. 
St. Fulgentius of Ruspe was ordered to be scourged here by an Arian priest in 499
Arnobius of Sicca Veneria (Arnobius the Elder)

Gallery

 Notes and references 

 Sources 
Tahar Ayachi, El Kef, éd. Office national du tourisme tunisien, Tunis, 2007
Abdelhamid Larguèche [sous la dir. de], Revoir El Kef, éd. MC-Editions, Carthage, 2005 
Camille Mifort, Vivre au Kef. Quand la Tunisie était française, éd. MC-Editions, Carthage, 2008
Cornelia Smet, Si ma grand-mère était Keffoise'', éd. MC-Editions, Carthage, 2005

External links 

Site sur la ville du Kef
Voyage archéologique et historique aux origines de l'ancienne Cirta
 Lexicorient

Cities in Tunisia
Communes of Tunisia
History of Tunisia by location
Roman sites in Tunisia
Phoenician cities
Populated places established in the 3rd century BC
Maghreb